Jon Kroll is an American producer, director, and writer who has worked in film and both scripted and non-scripted television. He is notable for his work in television which has been seen on a variety of broadcast and cable networks over the past 30 years. His most recent project is "Gordon Ramsay: Uncharted," for National Geographic Network. 

Over the past two decades, Kroll has directed three feature films and produced dozens of television programs, including The Amazing Race, for which he was honored with a 2004 Primetime Emmy Award. For four years, he was Executive Vice President, Original Programming, for New Line Television where he served as Executive Producer for both scripted and unscripted programming. After leaving, he formed entertainment production company Loveable Scoundrels, which has since produced shows for various outlets. He is also an Adjunct Professor for USC's School of Cinematic Arts.

Early life
Kroll was raised on a commune in Northern California where there was no electricity or television.  He attended San Francisco State University where he earned his Bachelor's in Film Production, and then the University of Southern California School of Cinema-Television's Peter Stark Motion Picture Producing Program, where he received an MFA.

Career

Work in Film 
Kroll recently directed "From Hell to Hollywood," a biographical documentary about the life of Associated Press photojournalist Nick Ut whose 1972 Pulitzer Prize-winning photo is credited with helping to bring an end to the Vietnam War. The film premiered at Kansas City Film Fest International, where it won the Audience Award, and will screen in late 2021 at the Rising Sun International Film Festival in Japan. 

Earlier in his career, Kroll directed three narrative films, including Amanda and the Alien based on a short story by Robert Silverberg, which became Showtime's highest rated original film of 1995. He directed two other films, Menno's Mind and The Clone, and developed Arthur C. Clarke's short story Patent Pending into a feature script for Showtime, but it was not produced.

Television 
Kroll previously produced "Pink Collar Crimes," an 8-episode true crime series for CBS. The series documented outrageous non-violent crimes perpetrated by housewives, PTA moms and grandmothers. Kroll has also produced such shows as "American Grit" and "Bullseye" for Fox, “The Week the Women Went” for the BBC and Lifetime,  “Pit Bulls & Parolees” for Animal Planet, “Flipping Vegas” for A&E, "Big Brother" on CBS, High School Confidential on WE-TV, and From Star Wars to Star Wars on Fox. He also co-executive produced The Amazing Race, for which he won a 2004 prime time Emmy Award.  His most notable scripted show to date has been Blade: The Series, which was SPIKE TV's first original dramatic series.

Amish in the City 
Kroll's most controversial project has been "Amish in the City," a show for UPN that caused 51 members of congress to send a letter of protest to the network. The show eventually aired to critical acclaim.

Other work 
In addition to his film credits and television credits, Kroll has been responsible for several live stage productions, radio programs for National Public Radio, and was the Supervising Show Director for Sanrio Harmonyland, a Hello Kitty-themed amusement park in Japan.

External links
Loveable Scoundrels Official Site

American film directors
San Francisco State University alumni
Living people
Year of birth missing (living people)